Hyposmocoma chilonella is a species of moth of the family Cosmopterigidae. It was first described by Lord Walsingham in 1907. It is endemic to the Hawaiian islands of Kauai, Oahu, Maui, Molokai and Hawaii.

The larvae of the nominate subspecies are whitish and feed on Acacia koa, Aleurites moluccanus, Cheirodendron gaudichaudii, Coprosma foliosa and other Coprosma species, Metrosideros, Pipturus, Rubus hawaiiensis and Smilax sandwicensis. They bore in dead wood or pith. The larvae of subspecies H. c. percondita probably feed on dead wood. Larvae of subspecies H. c. triocellata have been recorded boring in dead wood of Cheirodendron, Hibiscus, Pipturus, Pittosporum, Rubus hawaiiensis and Wikstroemia. Larvae of subspecies H. c. venosa bore in dead wood of Wikstroemia.

Subspecies
Hyposmocoma chilonella chilonella Walsingham, 1907 (Kauai, Oahu, Maui, Hawaii)
Hyposmocoma chilonella percondita Walsingham, 1907 (Kauai, Hawaii)
Hyposmocoma chilonella triocellata Walsingham, 1907 (Kauai, Oahu, Molokai, Hawaii)
Hyposmocoma chilonella venosa Walsingham, 1907 (Kauai, Molokai, Hawaii)

External links

chilonella
Endemic moths of Hawaii
Moths described in 1907
Taxa named by Thomas de Grey, 6th Baron Walsingham